Luncarty Junior Football Club are a Scottish football club based in the village of Luncarty, near Perth, Perth and Kinross.

History
They were formed in 1886 by employees of a local bleachworks and after some years in local Senior football, joined the Junior grade in 1921.

Up until the end of the 2005–06 season, they played in Tayside Division One in the Scottish Junior Football Association's East Region, and they finished second in the division's final season.

This would have seen them promoted into the Tayside Premier League but the SJFA restructured prior to the 2006–07 season, and the Bleachers found themselves in the twelve-team East Region, Central Division. They finished sixth in their first season in the division.

Luncarty played in its first major cup final for 25 years in May 2014, reaching the GA Engineering Cup Final, played at Tannadice Stadium. The Bleachers lost out on penalties to Lochee United after the match finished 1–1.

They club spent a year in abeyance during the 2015–16 season but returned to competitive action in 2016–17 with a new management team of Jon Kelly and Richie Montgomery. 29 January 2020, Jonny Kelly stepped down as manager of the club after four years.

One of their local rivals was Bankfoot Athletic, but the club based a few miles to the north folded in 2014. Four years later, two other rivals from the city of Perth, Jeanfield Swifts and Kinnoull left the Junior setup to join the East of Scotland Football League within the senior pyramid, a move Luncarty themselves made in 2020.

Notable players

 Jim Patterson

Honours

 Perthshire Junior League winners: 1928–29, 1931–32, 1949–50, 1964–65
 East Region Tayside Division One runners-up: 2005–06
 Tayside League Division Two winners: 1972–73, 1989–90
 Constitutional Cup winners: 1940–41, 1964–66
 Currie Cup winners: 1957–58
 PA Cup winners: 1963–64, 1971–72
 Perthshire Junior Cup winners: 1940–41, 1952–53, 1963–64
 Perthshire Rose Bowl winners: 1962–63, 1968–69
 Supplementary League winners: 1968–69
 Davie Scott Good Conduct Trophy: 1983–84, 1991–92, 1993–94
 Luncarty Tournament winners: 2004
 Alex Jack Cup winners: 2022–23

References

External links
Club website

Football clubs in Scotland
Scottish Junior Football Association clubs
Association football clubs established in 1886
Football clubs in Perth and Kinross
1886 establishments in Scotland
East of Scotland Football League teams